William Richard Townley (born 1877) was a British trade unionist.

Born in Northampton, Townley left school at the age of ten to work at an engineering firm, later moving to a boot-making company.  He joined the National Union of Boot and Shoe Operatives (NUBSO), and became president of his branch of the union.  During World War I, he sat on a military service tribunal, making decisions on exemptions from conscription. This created controversy when he came before the tribunal himself and was granted six months' exemption by his colleagues.

Townley was also active in the Labour Party, and was elected to Northampton Town Council, representing the North ward.  He additionally served as a magistrate.

In 1929, Townley was elected as the president of NUBSO, and the following year, he was also elected to the General Council of the Trades Union Congress (TUC).  He was the TUC's delegate to the American Federation of Labour in 1937, and retired later that year.

References

1877 births
Year of death missing
General Presidents of the National Union of Boot and Shoe Operatives
Members of the General Council of the Trades Union Congress
People from Northampton